Jean-Noël Alexandre Robert (born 30 December 1949 in Paris) is a French orientalist, specialist of the history of Buddhism in Japan and of its Chinese predecessors. His work particularly focus on Tendai and the philology of Sino-Japanese Buddhist texts. He is the author of the French translation of the Lotus Sūtra, seminal text of Mahayana 大乘 (great vehicle), from the ancient Chinese text.
 
In 2011, he was appointed a professor at the Collège de France to become the holder of the chair Philologie de la civilisation japonaise.

Biography 
Graduated in Japanese from the Institut national des langues et civilisations orientales in 1970, Jean-Noël Robert was a resident of the Franco-Japanese House of Tokyo in 1974–1975. From 1975 to 1990, he worked at the CNRS and since 1979, lecturer and director of studies at the fifth section of the École pratique des hautes études (EPHE). A doctor ès lettres and social science (1987), he was appointed director of the Institut des hautes études japonaises des Instituts d’Asie of the Collège de France in 2010.

On 11 April 2011, he was appointed professor at the College of France where he became holder of the Chair of Philologie de la civilisation japonaise.

Jean-Noël Robert is a member of numerous scientific societies and specialized committees: "Société française des études japonaises de Paris", "commissions des spécialistes" of the Institut national des langues et civilisations orientales (Paris Diderot University), "commission scientifique" of the École pratique des hautes études (Ve section), counsellor of the Société Asiatique, board of the École française d'Extrême-Orient.

He was elected on 17 March 2006, member of the Académie des Inscriptions et Belles-Lettres at the chair of André Caquot.

He is chevalier of the Ordre national du Mérite and officier of the Ordre des Palmes Académiques.

Jean-Noël Robert also writes in Latin under the pseudonym Alexander Ricius.

References

Publications 
1986: Lectures élémentaires en style sino-japonais (kanbun)
1990: Doctrines de l’école japonaise Tendai au début du IXe : Gishin et le Hokke-shû gi shû (doctorate thesis)
1995: Contempler le sanctuaire du cœur : le bouddhisme vu par un bouddhologue français, (published in Japanese in 1997)
2001: Kanbun for the XXIst Century : The Future of Dead Languages, (in Japanese)
2003: Sûtra du Lotus, suivi du Livre des sens innombrables et du Livre de la contemplation de Sage-Universel (translation)
2007: Quatre courts traités sur la Terrasse Céleste, Fayard, series "Trésors du bouddhisme",  
2008: Petite histoire du bouddhisme, Librio Document  
2008: La Centurie du Lotus : poèmes de Jien (1155-1225) sur le Sûtra du Lotus

External links 
 Site des membres de l’Académie des Inscriptions et Belles-Lettres

French Japanologists
Academic staff of the École pratique des hautes études
Academic staff of the Collège de France
Members of the Académie des Inscriptions et Belles-Lettres
Members of the Société Asiatique
Commandeurs of the Ordre des Palmes Académiques
Chevaliers of the Légion d'honneur
Knights of the Ordre national du Mérite
1949 births
Living people